The Women's Museum of California (WMC) is a nonprofit museum located in San Diego, California and dedicated to women's history. It was first organized under the names the Women's History Reclamation Project and then the Women's History Museum and Educational Center. It was founded in 1983. In addition to exhibits and programs offered, the WMofC also co-founded and hosts the San Diego County Women's Hall of Fame. The museum is located at Liberty Station and has exhibit space, archives, a library and a store that features items made exclusively by women. Other museum offerings include speakers and monthly lecture series.

History 
The museum had its roots with the women's rights activist, Mary B. Maschal who collected items from women's history in her home. The home had formally belonged to a suffragist, Veronica Burke. Maschal had been collecting artifacts relating to women's history since the 1970s. She finally opened her collection to the public in 1983, naming it the Women's History Reclamation Project (WHRP). Maschal felt a passion for collecting artifacts because of her "own disappointment over the lack of knowledge about women's history among the younger generation." Maschal also received a grant in 1984 in order to conduct and collect oral history interviews.

The initial success of Mary Maschal was sparked by the Women's History Reclamation Project. In addition to taking part in UN conferences, Maschal joined the National Organization for Women as a public member while also honing the skills necessary to work well with others in business. To preserve the legacy of past-generational leaders, she started a museum educating others on second-wave feminism. The Women's Museum of California continues to preserve her legacy towards the newer generation.

Maschal moved her collection to the Art Union Building in Golden Hill in 1997. Maschal died in 1998, and Cindy Stankowski and Sue Gonda took over leadership of the museum. In 2000, the museum sponsored a Women's History Poetry contest, which was held at the same time as an exhibit titled In Our Own Voice: women's History through Women's Poetry. The museum co-created the San Diego County Women's Hall of Fame in 2001. In 2003, the Project changed its name to the Women's History Museum and Educational Center (WHMEC).

The Women's History Museum and Educational Center changed its name again in 2011, this time to the Women's Museum of California (WMofC). They concurrently updated the museum logo. WMC also moved to the Liberty Station Promenade in Point Loma in 2012. The new location was three times larger than their former location at Golden Hill.

Helen Hawkins Memorial Library and Research Archive 
Part of the museum is a library and archive. The Helen Hawkins Memorial Library and Research Archive includes books and several special collections. Part of the special collections is the Alice Park Archive which collects artifacts from the women's suffrage movement from the late 19th century and early 20th century. The special collections also include papers documenting the career of Lucy Killea, a collection of materials relating to the UN Conference on the Status of Women and the Neff-LeClair Collection of period women's clothing dating from the 18th century on.

Film Festival 
The Women's Museum of California offers a Film Festival that showcases women who have worked in the film industry to show their film creations and share their experiences with others. The film festival includes a panel that consists of activists and filmmakers that discuss the representation and roles of women in the film industry environment.

After eight years, the Women's Film Festival ended in 2021 due to the impact of the COVID-19 pandemic. The following year, the Women's Museum began sponsoring a "Women's Series" under the umbrella of the San Diego International Film Festival.

San Diego County Women's Hall of Fame 
The Hall of Fame was created in 2001, partly through the WMofC and other organizations. Some organizations that have partnered with WMofC for the hall of fame include the Girl Scouts, MANA, A National Latina Organization and Executive Women International. Co-Hosts of the HOF include the Museum, the San Diego County Commission on the Status of Women, San Diego State University's Women's Studies Department, and the Women's Center of the University of California, San Diego. Inductions into the hall of fame take place in March during Women's History Month. Each year about five women are inducted.

The San Diego County Women's Hall of Fame mission is "to acknowledge and honor women who have significantly contributed to the quality of life and who have made outstanding volunteer contributions in San Diego County."

List of inductees

References

Additional sources

External links 
 Official site
 Mary Maschal (video)

1983 establishments in California
Museums in San Diego
Museums established in 1983
Women's museums in California
History of women in California